1996 is a 1996 album by Japanese composer and pianist Ryuichi Sakamoto. It contains a selection of Sakamoto's most popular compositions plus two new compositions, all arranged for a standard piano trio. The arrangement of "Bibo no Aozora" that appears on this album has appeared in several film and television projects; one notable example is the film Babel, whose soundtrack features both the 1996 version and the /04 version of the song.

Track listing
All songs composed by Ryuichi Sakamoto.

The CD releases on the Milan label in the U.S. and Brazil have only tracks 1-12.  The Milan CD release in the UK has only tracks 1-15.

Live concert 

A concert, called Ryuichi Sakamoto Trio World Tour, was organized in 1996. The setlist of this concert is different than the original album. This concert was  played at 6 venues in Japan, and the Bunkamura Orchard Hall concert was live streamed on August 28, 1996 on the Internet, and was one of the first concerts to be streamed. This concert was released on both DVD and Laserdisc.

Personnel
Performers
Ryuichi Sakamoto – piano
Jaques Morelenbaum – cello
Everton Nelson – violin (tracks 1, 3 – 7, 9 – 12 & 14)
David Nadien – violin (tracks 2 & 8)
Barry Finclair – violin (tracks 13 & 15)

Technical
Fernando Aponte – engineer, mixing
Ted Jensen – mastering
Joe Lizzi & Jason Goldstein – assistant engineers
Hideki Nakajima – art direction, design
Yoshinori Ochiai – design
Kazunari Tajima – photography
Clare de Graw & David Rubinson – production managers

References

Ryuichi Sakamoto albums
1996 compilation albums
Instrumental albums
Instrumental compilation albums
Soundtrack compilation albums
Milan Records compilation albums
Albums produced by Ryuichi Sakamoto